The 6th Group Communication and Information Systems (6 Gp CIS) is a military communications unit in the Special Operations Regiment  of the Belgian Armed Forces.

Tasks of the unit
The men and women from the 6 Gp CIS enable special operations by installing, operating and maintaining secured CIS at Strat, Ops and Tac level during Overt and Covert operations or as SOF (Special Operations Force) Enablers which means: “following the SOTG (Special Operations Task Group) on the field”! 
In order to do so, the CIS operators from the 6 Gp CIS are expected to develop multiple skills, both technical and military. The unit comprises also an air-insertion capacity and is able to operate in specific tactical environments that require commando techniques. 
At CIS level, the aim is to provide all the necessary secure and unsecure services with a minimum footprint in both material and personnel. This concept of “Communication Centres” is used as a focal point upon which all other aspects of the 6 Gp CIS are based; the order of battle, resources, planning process and technical architecture are constantly being tweaked in order to perform the role of SOF Enablers. 
On the technical level, an innovative shift towards a light-client architecture is taking place: heavy equipment and computing power is located in Belgium whereas only light means are deployed to the theatre of operations. This minimizes the in-theatre footprint in both material and CIS operators. At the same time, it maximizes the efficiency of the allocated airtime for satellite communications, thus improving the network performance.
Furthermore, the unit is part of the Tactical Land Communications Program (TLCP) to equip all units of the SO Regiment with HARRIS (Harris Corporation) data radios. This offers the Special Operations Regiment data transmission by means of flexible radios and ensures interoperability with international partners in both secure and unsecure waveforms. For longer distances, the implementation of VHF/HF multirole radios (AN/PRC-152) will also reduce satellite airtime. 
Members of the 6 Gp CIS are also prepared to act on the shortest notice in different situations: from non-combatant evacuation operations to B-FAST (Belgian First Aid and Support Team) for example. 
Finally, the 6 Gp CIS provides specific services to the whole BEL Defense community: DCN-L1, in charge of assuring Level 1-support for the bulk of the classified networks used, and Pool Mat, in charge of managing Mat-packs for Operations and Exercises.

History
During the mobilization for the First World War, the 6th (United Kingdom) Division counted a section of telegraphists in its ranks: the 6th section Telegraphists. 
After the Second World War, on May 21, 1951, the 6th Coy TTr saw the light of day in Aachen as a part of the 6th Armoured Division (The Division was reformed in May 1951 in the UK and later assigned to the British Army of the Rhine (BAOR)). Having been relocated several times in Germany - Belgian Forces in Germany (Aachen (May 1951 - September 1951 Tabora Kazerne), Bensberg (September 1951 - April 1960 Kwartier Diksmuide), Arnsberg (April 1960 - March 1969 Kwartier Reigersvliet) and finally Ludenscheid (March 1969 - July 1994 Kwartier De Leie)), the Coy finally becomes a battalion in December 1960. On March 9, 1962, the unit receives its colors out of the hands of his Majesty King Baudouin of Belgium. 
Consecutive reorganizations led to a redeploy to the Peutie's barracks in 1994, where the unit is merged with the Belgian signaling school to become the operational Coy there. 
On Sep 6th, 2002 this Coy was split off from the school to form the nucleus of the unit as we know it today: the 6 Gp CIS. In the following years, the unit was reinforced with personnel from 2nd Gp CIS and 5th Gp CIS.

Coat of arms
The 6 Gp CIS, formerly 6 TTr, has kept in its coat of arms the pioneer's breastplate as a memento of the time that the Signaling-troops were still a part of the Engineer Corps. The azure and white background, inherited from the British Royal Corps of Signals, and the lightning in the breastplate refer to the Signaling arm. 
The crossed lances with Belgian pennants, the Royal crown and the colors on the edges of the coat of arms, red and white, remember the attachment to the 6 Armoured Division since this Division had inherited the traditions of the cavalry units. 
The motto ‘Servio et Adjuvo’ means: ‘I serve and I help’ and points at the mission the unit fulfills towards its command.

Colors
The colors bear the following honorable mentions:

‘Veldtocht 1914-1918’ (Campaign 1914-1918 (German invasion of Belgium)): awarded to all units of the landforces participating in the 1914-1918 campaign.

‘Yzer-Vlaanderen 1918’ (Yzer-Flanders 1918 (Battle of the Yser)): to commemorate the individual courage and the tireless dedication displayed by the telegraphists and the radiotelegraphists when setting up and maintaining the communications lines on the Flanders and Yzer battlefields in the 1914-1918 period.

‘Slag van Belgie 1940’ (Battle of Belgium 1940): During the May 1940 campaign, all the units belonging to the Signaling Regiment displayed so much stamina, complete dedication and infinite courage whilst fulfilling their heavy, all too often hidden and unfamiliar, duties. It is thanks to their technical and military qualities that even in the harshest of times command could be conducted in a normal way.

Fourragère
This Fourragère in the colors of the ‘Oorlogskruis 1914-1918’ (Cross of War 1914-1918) with red and green accents is granted to units who have received two honorable mentions. Every member of such a unit shall wear a fourragère in the colors of the Cross of War (Croix de Guerre).
The fourragère should not be confused with an Aiguillette nor a Lanyard.

CIS, 6
Vilvoorde